Sennur Ulukus from the University of Maryland, College Park, MD was named Fellow of the Institute of Electrical and Electronics Engineers (IEEE) in 2016 for contributions to characterizing performance limits of wireless networks.

References 

Fellow Members of the IEEE
University of Maryland, College Park faculty
21st-century American engineers
Living people
Year of birth missing (living people)
Place of birth missing (living people)